Josef P. Freud (also known as Joseffy) (3 March 1873 – 26 May 1946) was a Viennese magician.

Life
Joseffy came to the United States of America at the age of 19 where he worked at a Chicago Magic Store, building props and illusions. He invented a self-contained, no-thread version of The Rising Cards that astounded magicians of his day. One of his mechanical creations was "Balsamo, the Living Skull".

Joseffy was a performer at Coney Island as the Chautauqua & Lyceum headliner, and also played violin.

The American poet Carl Sandburg wrote a promotional booklet entitled simply Joseffy (1910).

Joseffy eventually stopped performing and became an electrical engineer.

Literature 
 The Marvelous Creations of Joseffy by David Abbott (1908)

Being very secretive about his inventions, it's been stated that in his book, The Marvelous Creations of Joseffy by David P. Abbott (1908), he either faked the photographs or showed apparatus that he did not actually use in the tricks to mislead the readers to the genuine secrets.

See also 
 List of magicians
 Card magic

References

External links 
 
 Chautauqua & Lyceum Magicians

Austrian magicians
1873 births
1946 deaths
Card magic
Vaudeville performers
Entertainers from Vienna
Austro-Hungarian emigrants to the United States